The 2008 IAAF Road Race Label Events were the inaugural edition of the global series of road running competitions given Label status by the International Association of Athletics Federations (IAAF). All five World Marathon Majors had Gold Label status. The races were mostly in North America, Western Europe, and East Asia. It was the first year that the IAAF had provided the race designation. The series included a total of 49 road races, 12 Gold and 37 Silver Label status. In terms of distance, 32 races were marathons, 8 were half marathons, 6 were 10K runs, and 3 were held over other distances.

The Ohme Road Race scheduled for 3 February was cancelled due to heavy snow.

Races

References 

Race calendar
Calendar 2008 IAAF Label Road Races. IAAF. Retrieved 2019-09-22.

2008
IAAF Road Race Label Events